Ceroplastic acid (or pentatriacontanoic acid) is a saturated aliphatic carboxylic acid.

The name is derived from the Latin word cerotus, which in turn was derived from the Ancient Greek word κηρός (keros), meaning beeswax or honeycomb, combined with "plastic" from the Latin plasticus (meaning of molding, from Greek plastikos, from plassein to mold, form).

Applications
Like many other carboxylic acids, ceroplastic acid can react with UV curable moiety alcohols to form reactive esters, such as 2-allyloxyethanol.

See also
List of saturated fatty acids

References

External links
Ceroplastic acid at the Nature Lipidomics Gateway

Fatty acids
Alkanoic acids